The 1951–52 Iowa State Cyclones men's basketball team represented Iowa State University during the 1951-52 NCAA College men's basketball season. The Cyclones were coached by Clay Sutherland, who was in his fifth season with the Cyclones. They played their home games at the Iowa State Armory in Ames, Iowa.

They finished the season 10–11, 4–8 in Big Seven play to finish in a tie for fourth place.

The February 11 home game against Kansas marked the first ever live telecast of an Iowa State basketball home game. WOI-TV broadcast the game in central Iowa.

Roster

Schedule and results 

|-
!colspan=6 style=""|Regular Season

|-

References 

Iowa State Cyclones men's basketball seasons
Iowa State
Iowa State Cyc
Iowa State Cyc